Jacobbi McDaniel (born October 8, 1989) is an American football defensive tackle who is currently a free agent. He played college football at Florida State University. He has also been a member of the Cleveland Browns of the National Football League.

Early years
McDaniel played high school football and baseball at Madison County High School in Madison, Florida. He earned first-team Big Bend honors in baseball as a junior and a senior, while also receiving first-team All-State accolades his senior year. He nearly won the Big Bend triple crown as a junior, hitting .589 with 13 home runs. McDaniel was named the 2008–09 Gatorade Player of the Year in football in the state of Florida, earning Big Bend first-team honors his senior year. He was honored as a USA Today and Under Armour All-American. He was drafted in the 33rd round by the Milwaukee Brewers in the 2009 MLB Draft. McDaniel was listed as a third baseman in the Draft.

College career
McDaniel was a member of the Florida State Seminoles football team from 2009 to 2013.

Professional career

McDaniel signed with the Cleveland Browns on May 19, 2014 after going undrafted in the 2014 NFL Draft. He was released by the Browns on August 30, 2014 and signed to the team's practice squad on August 31, 2014. He was promoted to the active roster on October 18, 2014. McDaniel made his NFL debut on October 19, 2014 against the Jacksonville Jaguars. He was released by the Browns on October 20 and signed to the team's practice squad on October 22, 2014. He was waived by the Browns on November 11 and signed to the team's practice squad on November 18, 2014. McDaniel was released by the Browns on September 5, 2015.

McDaniel was assigned to the Cleveland Gladiators on January 9, 2017.

References

External links

College stats
Jacobbijustice.com

Living people
1989 births
American football defensive tackles
African-American players of American football
Under Armour All-American football players
Florida State Seminoles football players
Cleveland Browns players
Cleveland Gladiators players
Players of American football from Florida
People from Madison, Florida
21st-century African-American sportspeople
20th-century African-American people